The 36th Vehbi Emre & Hamit Kaplan Tournament 2018, was a wrestling event held in Istanbul, Turkey between 20 and 22 July 2018.

This international tournament includes competition men's Greco-Roman wrestling. This ranking tournament was held in honor of the Olympic Champion, Hamit Kaplan and Turkish Wrestler and manager Vehbi Emre.

Medal table

Team ranking

Greco-Roman

Participating nations
150 competitors from 16 nations participated.

 (14)
 (11)
 (1)
 (7)
 (13)
 (8)
 (3)
 (11)
 (17)
 (13)
 (2)
 (7)
 (2)
 (3)
 (29)
 (9)

Ranking Series
Ranking Series Calendar 2018:
 1st Ranking Series: 25–26 January, Iran, Mahshahr  ⇒ 2018 Takhti Cup (GR)
 2nd Ranking Series: 26–28 January, Russia, Krasnoyarsk ⇒ Golden Grand Prix Ivan Yarygin 2018 (FS)
 3rd Ranking Series: 15–23 February, Cuba, La Havana ⇒ 2018  Granma y Cerro Pelado (FS, WW, GR)  
 4th Ranking Series: 16–18 February, Sweden, Klippan ⇒ Klippan Lady Open (2018) (WW) 
 5th Ranking Series: 9–10 June, Mongolia, Ulaanbaatar ⇒ 2018 Mongolia Open (FS, WW)
 6th Ranking Series: 22–23 June, China, Taiyuan ⇒ 2018 China Open (WW)
 7th Ranking Series: 23–24 June, Hungary, Győr ⇒ 2018 Hungarian Grand Prix (GR)
 8th Ranking Series: 3–5 July, Georgia, Tbilisi ⇒  2018 Tbilisi Grand Prix of V. Balavadze and G. Kartozia (FS, GR)
 9th Ranking Series: 20–22 July, Turkey, Istanbul ⇒  2018 Vehbi Emre & Hamit Kaplan Tournament (GR)
 10th Ranking Series: 27–20 July, Turkey, Istanbul ⇒  2018 Yasar Dogu Tournament (FS, WW)
 11th Ranking Series: 7–9 September, Poland, Warsaw  ⇒  Ziolkowski, Pytlasinski, Poland Open (FS, WW, GR)  
 12th Ranking Series: 14–16 September, Belarus, Minsk  ⇒  Medved (Test Event Minsk 2019)

References 

Vehbi Emre and Hamit Kaplan
Vehbi Emre and Hamit Kaplan
February 2018 sports events in Turkey
Sports competitions in Istanbul
International wrestling competitions hosted by Turkey
Vehbi Emre & Hamit Kaplan Tournament